Morpho amathonte is a Neotropical butterfly belonging to the subfamily Morphinae of the family Nymphalidae. It is considered, by some authors, to be a subspecies of Morpho menelaus.

The genus Morpho is palatable but some species (such as M. amathonte) are very strong fliers; birds – even species which are specialized for catching butterflies on the wing – find it very hard to catch them. The conspicuous blue coloration shared by most Morpho species may be a case of Müllerian mimicry, or may be 'pursuit aposematism'.

Description
The total number of days for which it takes this species to grow into an adult is about 120 days. During this time, the butterfly is an egg for 14 days, then remains as larvae for 83 days, and then remains a pupa for about 19 days. This species shows an evident sexual dimorphism which differentiates males from females. The basic color in males is bright metallic blue, sometimes bluish. In the females the upper surfaces of the wings are partially blue and have a wide dark gray-brown margins, decorated with small white spots running along the outer edge of both wings. From closely related species Morpho amathonte is distinguished by a large dark spot at the top of the front wings. The undersides of the wings are brown, becoming lighter towards the edges, with three or four colorful and bright eyespots clearly visible on each wing.

Distribution
This species can be found in Panama, Costa Rica, Venezuela, Colombia and Ecuador.

References

Le Moult (E.) & Réal (P.), 1962-1963. Les Morpho d'Amérique du Sud et Centrale, Editions du cabinet entomologique E. Le Moult, Paris.
Paul Smart, 1976 The Illustrated Encyclopedia of the Butterfly World in Color. London, Salamander: Encyclopedie des papillons. Lausanne, Elsevier Sequoia (French language edition)   page 234 fig. 4 (Colombia)

External links
Butterflies of America Images of type and other specimens of Morpho menelaus amathonte
Taxonomy Browser Upperside and underside photographs.

Morpho
Nymphalidae of South America